Balankanche (also Balancanche, Balaamcanche, Balaancanche) is an ancient Maya cave site lying at short distance from the archaeological Maya-Toltec city of Chichen Itza, Yucatan. For more than two thousand years, it has been the focus of rituals dedicated to the Maya rain god, Chaac, and, in the Post-Classic period, also to his Toltec counterpart, Tlaloc. The cave complex was visited by Edward Thompson and Alfred Tozzer in 1905 and has since 1932 been explored and studied by various Mexican and US scholars. Small buildings and platforms surrounded the cave's entrance; inside, stairs, walls, altars and ritual displays of ceramics (especially censers) and small stone implements were discovered. The site has been made accessible for tourists.

Notes

Bibliography 
 Bruce Rogers, Grutas de Balancanche. // AMCS Activities Newsletter No. 27 , May 2004. pp. 79–83.
 E. Wyllys Andrews IV. Balankanche, Throne of the Tiger Priest. Tulane University, 1970. .
 

Cave sites in Mesoamerican archaeology
Caves of Mexico
Pre-Columbian era
Cave
Cave
Landforms of Yucatán